Westbury-on-Severn Halt railway station served the village of Westbury-on-Severn, Gloucestershire, England, from 1928 to 1959 on the South Wales Railway.

History
The station was opened on 9 July 1928 by the Great Western Railway. It closed on 10 August 1959.

References

Disused railway stations in Gloucestershire
Former Great Western Railway stations
Railway stations in Great Britain opened in 1928
Railway stations in Great Britain closed in 1959
1928 establishments in England
1959 disestablishments in England